Ty Alexander Lindeman (born 15 August 1997) is a Canadian badminton player. He trains at B-Active Badminton Club, and in 2015, he represented Alberta competed at the XXV Canada Games. He won two U23 national titles in 2016 for men's doubles (with Austin Bauer) and mixed doubles (with Takeisha Wang). In 2017, he won the silver medal at the Pan Am Championships in the men's doubles event with his partner, Austin Bauer. In 2018, he competed at the Commonwealth Games in Gold Coast.

Achievements

Pan Am Championships 
Men's doubles

Mixed doubles

Pan Am Junior Championships 
Boys' singles

Boys' doubles

Mixed doubles

BWF International Challenge/Series (3 titles, 1 runner-up) 
Men's doubles

Mixed doubles

  BWF International Challenge tournament
  BWF International Series tournament
  BWF Future Series tournament

References

External links 
 
 
 

1997 births
Living people
Sportspeople from St. Albert, Alberta
Canadian male badminton players
Badminton players at the 2018 Commonwealth Games
Badminton players at the 2022 Commonwealth Games
Commonwealth Games competitors for Canada
20th-century Canadian people
21st-century Canadian people